Polster is a surname.

Notable people with this surname include:
Bernd Polster (born 1952), German author
Burkard Polster (born 1965), German mathematician and math popularizer
Dan Polster (born 1951), American judge
Hermann Christian Polster (born 1937), German opera singer
James Alan Polster (1947–2012), American novelist
James Polster (born 1979), American volleyball player
Keith Polster, designer of The Fright at Tristor, a Dungeons & Dragons adventure module
Manuel Polster (born 2002), Austrian association football player
Matt Polster (born 1993), American association football player
Miriam Polster (1924–2001), US clinical psychologist
Rita Polster (born 1948), Finnish film actress
Toni Polster (born 1964), Austrian association football coach and former player
Victor Polster (born 2002), Belgian actor and dancer

See also
Sheri Polster Chappell (born 1962), American judge